Meggittia is a genus of predatory sea snails, marine gastropod molluscs in the family Pseudomelatomidae, the turrids and allies.

Not to be confused with Meggittia Lopez-Neyra, 1929; a genus of cestodes in the family Davaineidae.

Species
 Meggittia maungmagana Ray, 1977

References

 Ray, Harish Chandra. "Contribution to the knowledge of the molluscan fauna of Maungmagan, Lower Burma." (1977).

 
Pseudomelatomidae
Gastropod genera